The National League speedway 2019 now known as the National Development League for the 2019 season was the third tier/division of British speedway. There were several team changes for the 2019 league season with reigning league champions and KO cup winners Eastbourne Eagles, along with the Birmingham Brummies, moving into the SGB Championship. Coventry Bees, who rode their home meetings at Leicester the previous season, did not enter the league, but Leicester Lions entered a team (Leicester Lion Cubs).  Cradley Heathens fully entered the league after the previous season National Trophy only commitment, while the Buxton Hitmen decided not compete and only run open meetings (friendlies). It was announced on Tuesday 10 September before the end of the 2019 National Development League season that Stoke Potters' home venue at Loomer Road Stadium had been sold and that the team would not be operating in 2020.

Regulation changes
At the Speedway AGM in November 2018, the team averages were reduced to 36.00 points per team.

Results

Teams face each other two times: once home and once away.

Final table

Play-Offs

Home team scores are in bold
Overall aggregate scores are in red

Semi-finals

Grand Final

Leading Final Averages

Knockout Cup
The 2019 National Development League Knockout Cup was the 22nd edition of the Knockout Cup for tier three teams.

Home team scores are in bold
Overall aggregate scores are in red

Quarter-finals

Semi-finals

Grand Final

National Trophy

Results

Teams face each other two times: once home and once away.

Final table

NDL Riders' Championship
Raced at the Eddie Wright Raceway, Scunthorpe on 20 October. The meeting was decided on count back for riders first three rides, after rain prevented the meetings full conclusion. Scores below are from the referee's official National League Riders Individual Championship score sheet.
1 Anders Rowe (Kent Kings) 9
2 Drew Kemp (Kent Kings) 8
3 Max Clegg (Cradley Heathens) 8
4 Ellis Perks (Leicester Lion Cubs) 7
Leon Flint (Belle Vue Colts) 7
6 Ryan Kinsley (Mildenhall Fen Tigers) 6
 Kyle Bickley (Belle Vue Colts) 6
 Ben Morley (Isle of Wight Warriors) 6
9 Jordan Palin (Belle Vue Colts) 3
Jason Edwards (Mildenhall Fen Tigers) 3
Jack Smith (Cradley Heathens) 3
Tom Spencer (Cradley Heathens) (res) 3
13 Joe Thompson (Leicester Lion Cubs) 2
14 Connor Coles (Belle Vue Colts) 1
Danno Verge (Isle of Wight Warriors) 1
16 Joe Lawlor (Stoke Potters) 0
Tom Young (Plymouth Gladiators) 0
Sam Woods (Unattached) (res) 0

NDL Pairs
Sunday 25 August staged at Owlerton Stadium, Sheffield.

Group Stages
Group A
Leicester Lion Cubs 18
Kent Kings 18
Isle of Wight Warriors 10
Stoke Potters 8

Group B
Plymouth Gladiators 18
Mildenhall Fen Tigers 17
Belle Vue Colts 13
Cradley Heathens 6

Final
Kent Kings 19
Leicester Lion Cubs 17
Plymouth Gladiators 10
Mildenhall Fen Tigers 8

NDL Fours
Saturday 13 July staged at Loomer Road, Stoke.

Group Stages
Group A
Stoke Potters 18
Isle of Wight Warriors 14
Cradley Heathens 8
Leicester Lion Cubs 8

Group B
Mildenhall Fen Tigers 16
Kent Kings 
Plymouth Gladiators 8
Belle Vue Colts 8

Final
Stoke Potters 15
Isle of Wight Warriors 14
Mildenhall Fen Tigers 13
Kent Kings 6

Teams and final averages
Belle Vue Colts

 9.76
 9.12
 8.95
 8.55
 7.07
 4.67
 4.59

7 June Connor Bailey replaced the injured Paul Bowen in the Belle Vue Colts team

Cradley Heathens

 10.36
 6.93
 6.87
 6.71
 4.60
 3.87
 3.13
 1.14
 (1 match only)

21 May Jack Smith replaced the injured Tom Brennan in the Cradley Heathens team
6 June Sheldon Davies replaced Lewis Whitmore in the Cradley Heathens team

Isle of Wight Warriors

 9.94
 9.85
 6.54
 5.60
 5.36
 4.52
 4.50
 4.47

1 July Scott Campos replaced Ryan Terry-Daley in the Isle of Wight team

Kent Kings

 8.86
 8.68
 8.53
 8.33
 7.40
 6.22
 6.35
 6.12
 3.63

2 June Jacob Clouting replaced the injured Dan Gilkes in the Kent Kings team
15 August Jake Mulford replaced the injured Nathan Ablitt in the Kent Kings team
6 September Alex Spooner replaced Jacob Clouting in the Kent Kings team

Leicester Lion Cubs

 10.04
 9.61
 8.44
 7.52
 6.42
 6.31
 6.00
 3.59

11 April Ryan MacDonald replaced Kelsey Dugard in the Leicester Lion Cubs team
9 July Ryan Terry-Daley replaced the injured Jamie Halder in the Leicester Lion Cubs team
29 August Josh Embleton replaced Ryan MacDonald in the Leicester Lion Cubs team

Mildenhall Fen Tigers

 10.57
 8.67
 8.38
 8.00
 7.07
 6.40
 6.05
 5.50
 4.30
 3.13

16 June Henry Atkins and Arran Butcher replaced the injured Macauley Leek and David Wallinger in the Mildenhall team
13 August Ryan Kinsley replaced the injured Danny Ayres in the Mildenhall Fen Tigers team

Plymouth Gladiators

 9.22
 8.81
 7.03
 6.67
 4.75
 4.48 
 3.71
 3.71
 2.29
 2.00
 0.57

26 June David Wallinger replaced Scott Campos in the Plymouth team
10 July Luke Chessell replaced the injured Nathan Stoneman in the Plymouth team
28 August Tom Young and Kris Andrews replaced the injured Adam Extance and David Wallinger in the Plymouth team
6 September Nathan Stoneman replaced Luke Chessell in the Plymouth team

Stoke Potters

 8.71
 8.09
 8.00
 6.19
 5.27
 4.73
 2.33
 1.33

9 January Shelby Rutherford replaced Paul Burnett in the Stoke Potters team
9 May Lawlor replaced Luke Chessell in the Stoke Potters team
23 July Corban Pavitt quit the Stoke Potters team due to personal reasons
31 August Kieran Douglas replaced Corban Pavitt in the Stoke Potters team

Development Leagues

Midland & Southern Development League

Northern Junior League

See also
List of United Kingdom speedway league champions

References

National League
National League
Speedway National League